Caroline Black (born 4 March 1994) is an Irish female badminton player. In 2012, she became the runner-up of the Irish Future Series tournament in the mixed doubles event with her partner Stuart Lightbody. In 2014, she competed at the Commonwealth Games in Glasgow, Scotland representing Northern Ireland.

References

External links
 

1994 births
Living people
Sportspeople from Lisburn
Irish female badminton players
Commonwealth Games competitors for Northern Ireland
Badminton players at the 2014 Commonwealth Games
Badminton players at the 2010 Commonwealth Games